Pitcairnia beachiae is a species of flowering plant in the family Bromeliaceae, native to Costa Rica. It was first described in 1991.

References

beachiae
Flora of Costa Rica
Plants described in 1991